Thomas Edison Alston (January 31, 1926 – December 30, 1993) was a Major League Baseball first baseman who played for the St. Louis Cardinals from 1954 to 1957, the first African-American to do so.

Alston was acquired by St. Louis via a trade with the San Diego Padres of the Pacific Coast League, where he played in 180 games in 1953, on January 26, 1954, after team president Gussie Busch told manager Eddie Stanky to find a black player. Not only did Busch think excluding blacks from baseball was morally wrong, his company Anheuser–Busch, which had bought the team a year earlier to keep them from moving to Milwaukee, sold more beer to African-Americans than any other brewery, leading him to fear the effect of a boycott.

Busch was, however, somewhat disappointed by Alston. When he reported to the Cardinals, the team learned he was two years older than the Padres had claimed. Busch demanded they return $20,000 the Cardinals had included with the trade to account for two seasons that Busch believed the team could not get from Alston.

When he made his Major League debut (April 13, 1954 at Sportsman's Park), he became the first black player in St. Louis Cardinals history. He played in 66 games during his rookie season, batting .246 with 4 home runs and 34 runs batted in.  After that, he got into 25 more games over the course of the next three seasons. He spent most of his major league career splitting time between the majors and the Class AAA Omaha Cardinals, where he had a .306 batting average and 21 home runs in 1956.

Career totals for 91 games include a .244 batting average (66-for-271), 4 home runs, 36 RBI, 30 runs scored, and an on-base percentage of .311.  In his 81 appearances at first base, he handled 680 out of 689 total chances successfully for a fielding percentage of .987, just slightly under the league average during his era.

Alston's career was handicapped by neurasthenia and other mental disorders which forced his hospitalization after his playing career was over.

See also
List of first black Major League Baseball players by team and date

References

External links
Baseball Reference
Retrosheet

1926 births
1993 deaths
African-American baseball players
Baseball players from Greensboro, North Carolina
Major League Baseball first basemen
North Carolina A&T State University alumni
Omaha Cardinals players
Porterville Comets players
Rochester Red Wings players
San Diego Padres (minor league) players
St. Louis Cardinals players
20th-century African-American sportspeople